Day of the Gusano: Live in Mexico is the second live album by American heavy metal band Slipknot. The album features the first concert in Mexico from the ensemble, which took place on December 5, 2015. Shown in movie theatres on September 6, 2017, the album was released on October 20, 2017 by Eagle Vision. It was the band's first live album since 2005's 9.0: Live, and the first live album to feature bassist Alessandro Venturella and drummer Jay Weinberg, after the death of original bassist Paul Gray in 2010 and the departure of drummer Joey Jordison in 2013. It is also the band's final live album to feature their longtime percussionist Chris Fehn before his dismissal from the band due to a lawsuit in March 2019.

Track listing

Charts

References

2017 live albums
Slipknot (band) live albums
Slipknot (band) video albums